Minuscule 866 (in the Gregory-Aland numbering), ε405 (von Soden), is a 16th-century Greek minuscule manuscript of the New Testament on paper. The manuscript has no complex context, and some marginalia.

Description 

The codex contains the text of the Gospel of Matthew (7:25-10:40) on 7 paper leaves (size ), with a catena. It has some lacunae. The text is written in one column per page, 26 lines per page.

Text 

The Greek text of the codex is a representative of the Byzantine text-type. Kurt Aland placed it in Category V.

History 

C. R. Gregory dated the manuscript to the 14th century. Currently the manuscript is dated by the INTF to the 16th century.

The manuscript was added to the list of New Testament manuscripts by Gregory (866e). Gregory saw it in 1886. Formerly it was designated by 866a.

It was bound with some parts of another manuscripts. 4 leaves with text of Acts 6:17-13:2, in Greek and Latin, actually it is designated by 866b (Soden's α1375), and with minuscule 1918 from the 14th century, with text of Apocalypse.

Currently the manuscript is housed at the Vatican Library (Gr. 1882, fol. 10-16), in Rome.

See also 

 List of New Testament minuscules
 Biblical manuscript
 Textual criticism
 Minuscule 865

References

Further reading

External links 
 

Greek New Testament minuscules
16th-century biblical manuscripts
Manuscripts of the Vatican Library